The Contoocook River is a  river in New Hampshire. It flows from Contoocook Lake on the Jaffrey/Rindge border to Penacook (just north of Concord), where it empties into the Merrimack River. It is one of only a few rivers in New Hampshire that flow in a predominantly northward direction. Four covered bridges span the river, one in the town of Henniker, one on the Hancock-Greenfield line, and two in the town of Hopkinton, New Hampshire with one being in the village of Contoocook, and the other in the populated place of West Hopkinton. Residents and tourists have made the Contoocook popular for fishing and whitewater boating.

The name Contoocook came from the Pennacook tribe of Native Americans and perhaps means "place of the river near pines". Other variations of the name include the Abenaki meaning "nut trees river" or Natick language meaning "small plantation at the river."

The river gives its name to Contoocook, New Hampshire, a census-designated place (CDP) within the town of Hopkinton.

Principal tributaries
From south to north:

Nubanusit Brook begins at Nubanusit Lake in Nelson and joins the Contoocook in Peterborough.
The North Branch of the Contoocook starts in Stoddard and joins the main stem in Hillsborough.
The Warner River starts in Bradford and joins the Contoocook in Hopkinton.
The Blackwater River begins at Pleasant Lake in New London and joins the Contoocook in Hopkinton.

See also

List of New Hampshire rivers

References

External links
NH Department of Environmental Services The Contoocook and North Branch Rivers
American Whitewater description of the Freight Train rapids section

Tributaries of the Merrimack River
Rivers of New Hampshire
Rivers of Merrimack County, New Hampshire
Rivers of Cheshire County, New Hampshire
Rivers of Hillsborough County, New Hampshire
Hopkinton, New Hampshire
New Hampshire placenames of Native American origin